The MS Nordnorge (literally: Northern Norway) is a Hurtigruten (Norwegian Coastal Express) ship. It was completed in 1997 by Kværner Kleven in Ulsteinvik, Norway, as a sister ship to MS Polarlys and MS Nordkapp. The Nordnorge has a gross tonnage of 11,386, crew capacity of 57, and can carry up to 691 passengers.

Since 2002 the Nordnorge has been employed in Antarctic cruise service during the northern hemisphere winter.

There have been four Hurtigruten ships with the name of Nordnorge, which is Norwegian for "Northern Norway" – the common name of the three northern Norwegian counties.

During 2009 Nordnorge did not operate on the coast of Norway. The ship was hired out at the end of 2008 as a hotel ship in the Mediterranean, possibly in Venice.

Rescues

On January 30, 2007 the Nordnorge came to the aid of the MS Nordkapp after the Nordkapp ran aground in the Antarctic. All 294 passengers were safely evacuated from the Nordkapp and were taken to Ushuaia, Argentina.

On November 23, 2007 the Nordnorge was involved in the rescue of all passengers and crew from the MS Explorer after the Explorer struck an iceberg in the Antarctic.  All 100 passengers and 54 crew on the Explorer were safely rescued; the Explorer later sank.

Live television broadcast 
On June 16. 2011 at 19:45 CET, the Norwegian Public Service broadcaster NRK2 started transmitting live and non-stop footage of MS Nordnorge during its 134-hour voyage from Bergen to Kirkenes. During the voyage the stream was mostly live except for brief moments when the ship was out of satellite coverage. During such occasions, a pre-recorded backup from an earlier journey at the same location was shown until live coverage was restored.

References

External links 

 Web site of Hurtigruten ASA.
 Hurtigruten ASA information about MS Nordnorge: Hurtigruten.com (en); hurtigruten.us
 Hurtigruten-Web.com
 vesseltrack.com position of MS Nordnorge

Cruise ships
Passenger ships of Norway
Ships built in Ulstein
1996 ships
Hurtigruten